Ward Sutherland is a municipal politician who previously served as Councillor of Ward 1 in Calgary, Alberta. He was elected in the 2013 municipal election.

Awards

In January 2013, Sutherland was awarded the Queen Elizabeth II Diamond Jubilee Medal for significant contribution to the community.

Career before politics

Sutherland held senior leadership and management positions at companies such as Sony, Tim Hortons, McDonald’s, and Hartco.

Prior to being elected, Sutherland served as president of the Rocky Ridge Royal Oak Community Association.

2013 municipal election

Sutherland was elected to represent Ward 1 by capturing 39% of the votes, narrowly defeating Chris Harper, who also took 39%, but with 86 fewer votes.

2017 Controversy
In October 2017, days before a municipal election Ward Sutherland was accused of racist comments.  He was cited as referring to "Johnny Jew" from New York. He denied it and insisted he was referring to Jimmy Choo.

References

External links 
 City of Calgary Ward 1 homepage

Living people
Calgary city councillors
Year of birth missing (living people)